Kiryushino is a rural locality (a village) in Sergeikhinskoye Rural Settlement, Kameshkovsky District, Vladimir Oblast, Russia. The population was 8 as of 2010.

Geography 
Kiryushino is located 11 km northwest of Kameshkovo (the district's administrative centre) by road. Koverino is the nearest rural locality.

References 

Rural localities in Kameshkovsky District